Virginia de Castro e Almeida (née Virgínia Folque de Castro e Almeida Pimentel Sequiera e Abreu, November 24, 1874 – January 22, 1945) was a Portuguese writer. She is remembered for being a pioneer in Portuguese children’s literature, translating important cultural texts, and as being a film director and founding her own film company, Fortuna Films.

Early life and education
Virgínia de Castro e Almeida took an interest in writing from the young age of 8. She began by writing dramatic stories, and in later years would dedicate herself to writing books for children.

Career

In literature
In 1894, she started publishing her works under the pen-name Gy. Her first publication under this name was called “Fada Tendora” (“The Tempting Fairy”), and is considered to be a key piece of work in Portuguese children's literature. In 1907, a collection of her various works was published under the Livarario Clássica Editoria entitled “Biblioteca para meus Filhos” (“Library for my Children”). Virginia de Castro e Almeida, concerned with women’s education, published books about housekeeping and children, “Como Devo Governar a Minha Casa“ (“How to Run my Household”) in 1906, and “Como Devemos Criar e Educar os Nossos Filhos” (“How to Manage my Children’s Education”) in 1908. She also desired to teach children science and published several books towards that goal starting in 1907 such as: “Céu Aberto” (“Open Skies”) (1907), “Em Pleno Azul” (“Full Blue”) (1907), “Pela Terra e pelo Ar” (“For The Earth and Air”) (1911), and “As Lições de André” (“Lessons with André”) (1913).

In 1918, Virginia moved to France and later Switzerland. She helped to disseminate and promote Portuguese literature through translating the works of important historical and literary figures such as João de Barros and Garcia de Resende e Camões. Other translated works also includes historical topics dealing with Portuguese settlers such as Henry the Navigator, Marcus Aurelius, Cervantes, Charles Dickens, George Sand, and many more during the late 1930s and early 1940s. Also at this time, de Almeida further realised the benefit of using scientific concepts in books for children, and in an effort to encourage a love of history she wrote a series of books including titles such as “História de Dona Redonda e da sua Gente” (“History of Dona Redonda and her People”) (1942) and “de Aventuras de Dona Redonda” (“The Adventures of Dona Redonda”) (1943).

In government
While in Switzerland, de Almeida was employed under the League of Nations under the Portuguese government in Geneva. She also wrote books about the historical and political values of the New State of Portugal which was emerging at the time while working under the Secretariat of National Propaganda.

In film
In 1922, Virgínia founded Fortuna Films and became a producer due to her passion in cinematography. The headquarters of Fortuna Films was based in Virgínia's own house in Paris at Rue Monmatre, while Rue de S. Bento in Lisbon housed the Portuguese office, which was near another important Portuguese film company at the time. A prolific film director, :pt:Roger Lion, was hired by de Almeida, and the company produced only two films before either party could prove to sustain their short-lived venture.
She cites one reason for founding her own film company thusly: "Portuguese films up until now are not perfect. Sometimes the action drags, it was boring for people that were used to seeing beauty and art, listening to music made specifically for what they were seeing".

A Sereia de Pedra
A blacksmith living in the town of Tomar, part of a colony of Portugal, is good friends with a bullfighter named Antonio.

Olhos da Alma
In the town of Nazaré, two classes exist: one is the more important Diogo de Sousa and his family who are the boat owners. The other are the fishermen of lower means who send their trawlers out to sea tirelessly under the responsibility of António Dias, a man hardened by the ocean and respected by his fellow fishermen. Diogo starts a revolution between the classes. He takes refuge in his friend Rodrigo de Meneses’ house, and quickly takes a liking to his daughter Isolda. There, he discovers a secret, and uses it to convince Isolda to marry him. Others hear word of these events, and Diogo must run once again. Isolda, shocked by these new circumstances, is conflicted over her feelings of love for her cousin Alvaro.

Reception and controversy
This film is credited as putting the town of Nazaré onto the map of Portuguese cinema. Olhos da Alma gave light to the political situation of Portugal at the time, and almost caused a civil war during the end of Portugal’s First Republic.
Olhos da Alma was screened in Portugal, Brazil, and France, and received a great deal of criticism within its own country. This greatly affected Virgínia de Castro e Almeida. Roger Lion made numerous changes to the film which she complained about and did not approve of. The controversy brought about by the film resulted in the loss of interest and bankruptcy of Fortuna Films, marking the death of Virgínia’s film career.

Other notable achievements
In 1920, Virginia e Castro de Almeida, created a prize which would grant the year's best film made in France an award of 5 million francs.

Death
Virginia e Castro de Almeida died January 22, 1945, in Lisbon, Portugal.

Filmography

List of published works

References

Bibliography

1874 births
1945 deaths
People from Lisbon
Portuguese film directors
Portuguese women film directors
Portuguese children's writers